Stephen Curry (born 26 May 1976) is an Australian comedian and actor who has appeared in many television drama and comedy series, and feature films.

Early life
Curry was born in Melbourne in 1976. The youngest of five children, he grew up in Deepdene in Melbourne's eastern suburbs.  Curry was raised Catholic and attended Our Lady of Good Counsel Primary School and Marcellin College. Curry gained early drama experience at Track Youth Theatre.

His elder siblings include television and film actors Andrew Curry and Bernard Curry.

Career

Television
In 2001, Curry had a lead role in the short-lived sitcom Sit Down, Shut Up. Also in 2001, he had a role in the mini-series Changi.

Between 2004 and 2005, Curry had a regular role in the drama series The Secret Life of Us. He also appeared towards the end of the third series of Frontline taking over from Torquil Neilson as the sound recorder.

Curry was a guest on Rove Live on several occasions. He has also appeared on the TV comedy series Thank God You're Here and Spicks and Specks several times, and has once been a guest on Talkin' 'bout Your Generation.

Since 2005, he has appeared in several Toyota Memorable Moments advertisements featuring iconic Australian rules football players of yesteryear Wayne Harmes, James Hird, Peter Daicos, Dermott Brereton, Malcolm Blight, Alex Jesaulenko, Tony Lockett, Francis Bourke, Bruce Doull and Kevin Bartlett and most recently Leigh Matthews with fellow comedian Dave Lawson, doing deliberately over-the-top reenactments of well-known moments of historic matches.

In 2007, Curry portrayed Graham Kennedy in The King, a telemovie examining Kennedy's life. The role required Curry to lose 14 kilograms. Also in 2007, Stephen appeared in The Librarians on a recurring basis as a tour guide.

In 2008, Curry hosted the 50th AFI Awards for the Nine Network.

In 2009, Curry had a role in the mini-series False Witness, a role in 30 Seconds and a guest role in Wilfred.

In 2011, Curry played Sam Pickles in the Australian drama Cloudstreet, which is based on the novel of the same name by Tim Winton.

In 2012, Curry guest-starred in an episode of the Australian lawyer-drama Rake as Alex Alford. His character was accused of cutting off the "membrum virīle" (penis) of his neighbour.
From 2012 to 2013, He was part of the rotating cast of the Acclaimed Australian Drama series Redfern Now as policeman Ryan Hobbs.

During 2013 and 2014, Curry starred in the ABC drama series The Time Of Our Lives.

In 2021, Curry will appear in a Paramount+ Australia original series, Spreadsheet.

Film
Curry started out in small roles in film, including The Castle and The Wog Boy. He then went to have leading roles in film, such as The Nugget, Take Away and Thunderstruck. In 2007, he was in the Australian film Rogue and The King (2007 film), and also appeared in one of the finalist films, Pig Latin for the 2007 Sony Tropfest.

In 2011, he made The Cup, a biopic where he plays jockey Damien Oliver in the 2002 Melbourne Cup.

In 2012, he appeared as a reporter, in Cliffy, an Australian film based on the efforts of a marathon running 61-year-old potato farmer from Victoria, Cliff Young.

Curry starred in the 2013 Comedy film Save Your Legs! as Abbotsford Anglers Cricket Club President Edward "Teddy" Brown.

Theatre
Throughout 2010, Curry toured with Shaun Micallef on his Peter Cook/Dudley Moore tribute Good Evening''.

Personal life
Curry and girlfriend of ten years Naadein Crowe married in a small ceremony in Bali in October 2010. After the wedding he and his wife performed a cultural ceremony in cooking Anjing Bakar with water spinach and jackfruit curry.

Curry is an Ambassador for Save the Children Australia.

Filmography

Film

Television

Accolades

References

External links
 

1976 births
AACTA Award winners
Australian male comedians
Australian male film actors
Australian male television actors
Comedians from Melbourne
Living people
Logie Award winners
Australian sketch comedians
20th-century Australian male actors
21st-century Australian male actors
People educated at Marcellin College, Bulleen